The 2007 Men's World Ice Hockey Championships was the 12th such event hosted by the International Ice Hockey Federation.

The tournament was divided into two divisions, the top division, for the teams ranked 1st–8th in the world. Additionally, Division I consisted of the teams ranked 9th–16th in the world. All 16 teams would be eligible to win the top division world championship. At the conclusion of pool play, the last placed teams in pools A & B played in cross-over games against the winners of pool C & D. The winners advanced to the playoff in the top division, while the losers were entered into the Division I playoff round.

Top Division

Preliminary round

Group A

Group B

Qualifying round

Slovakia remains in Top Division, Brazil remains in Division I

Austria remains in Top Division, Great Britain remains in Division I

Championship Round

Draw 

Note: * denotes overtime period(s).

Placement games

Ranking and statistics

Tournament awards
Best players selected by the directorate:
Best Goalkeeper:       Pontus Sjogren
Best Defenseman:       Aki Tuominen
Best Forward:          Michael Wolf
Most Valuable Player:  Gasper Kroselj

Final standings
The final standings of the tournament according to IIHF:

Division I

Preliminary round

Group C

Group D

Finals round

Draw

Placement games

Note: * denotes overtime period(s).

Ranking and statistics

Final standings
The final standings of the tournament according to IIHF:

References 

IIHF InLine Hockey World Championship
Iihf Mens Inline Hockey World Championship, 2007
IIHF Men's InLine Hockey World Championship
Inline hockey in Germany
International sports competitions hosted by Germany